William N. Schultz (born May 1, 1967) is a retired American football offensive lineman who played professionally in the National Football League.

High school career
Schultz prepped at Kennedy High School in Granada Hills.

College career
Schultz played his first 2 years for Glendale Community College (California).
Schultz was a fourth-round draft choice from the University of Southern California in the 1990 NFL Draft.

Professional career
Schultz played for the Indianapolis Colts (1990–1993), the Houston Oilers (1994) for the Denver Broncos (1995) and for the Chicago Bears (1997).

References

1967 births
Living people
People from Granada Hills, Los Angeles
Players of American football from Los Angeles
American football offensive guards
American football offensive tackles
Glendale Vaqueros football players
USC Trojans football players
Indianapolis Colts players
Houston Oilers players
Denver Broncos players
Chicago Bears players